Timberhill Township is a township in Bourbon County, Kansas, USA.  As of the 2000 census, its population was 256.

Geography
According to the USGS, it contains three cemeteries: Dayton, Morris and Northway.

The Little Osage River and smaller streams of Baker Branch, Opossum Creek, Reagan Branch and Tippie Creek run through this township.

Further reading

References

 USGS Geographic Names Information System (GNIS)

External links
 City-Data.com
 Bourbon County Maps: Current, Historic Collection

Townships in Bourbon County, Kansas
Townships in Kansas